Kevin Thomas Roberts was the Archdeacon of Carlisle from 2009 until 2016. He has been the Acting Archdeacon of Wells since 5 September 2016.

Born in Saltburn-by-the-Sea on 11 October 1955, he was educated at Queens' College, Cambridge and ordained in 1984. Following  curacies at Beverley Minster and St John the Evangelist Church, Woodley, he was Vicar of Holy Trinity, Meole Brace from 1991 to 2009.

He is a director of the Simeon Trustees, a trust established in the nineteenth century by Charles Simeon to purchase advowsons for Anglican ministers aligned with the Evangelical Anglicanism.

References

1955 births
People from Saltburn-by-the-Sea
Honorary Chaplains to the Queen
Alumni of Queens' College, Cambridge
Archdeacons of Carlisle
Living people